Following is a list of dams and reservoirs in Puerto Rico.

The below list is incomplete.

Dams and reservoirs in Puerto Rico

This list is incomplete.  You can help Wikipedia by expanding it.

 Lago Caonillas, Utuado, Puerto Rico Electric Power Authority (PREPA)
 Carite Lake, Guayama, PREPA
 Carraízo Dam and Lago Loíza, Trujillo Alto, Puerto Rico Aqueducts and Sewers Authority (PRASA)
 Lake Cerrillos Dam, Ponce, United States Army Corps of Engineers
 Lago de Cidra, Cidra, PRASA
 Coamo Dam, between Coamo and Santa Isabel, PREPA
 Dos Bocas Lake, between Arecibo and Utuado municipalities, PREPA
 Guajataca Lake, between  San Sebastián, Quebradillas and Isabela municipalities, PREPA
 Lago Guayabal, Juana Díaz, PREPA
 Lago el Guineo (Rio Toro Negro), Villalba, PREPA
 Garzas, Peñuelas, PREPA 
 Lago La Plata, Toa Alta, PRASA
 Patillas Dam, Patillas, PREPA
 Portugués Dam, Ponce, USACE
 Rio Blanco Project, Naguabo, PREPA
 El Salto #1 and El Salto #2, Comerío
 Lago Toa Vaca, Villalba, PRASA
 Yauco Project, Yauco, PREPA

Gallery

References

External links

USGS List of Reservoirs in Puerto Rico

Puerto Rico
Dams